Denis Vladimirovich Gonchar is a Russian diplomat who formerly served as Acting Russian Ambassador to the United States. He succeeded Sergey Kislyak, and left office once Anatoly Antonov was sworn in as Russian Ambassador to the U.S.

He currently serves as Minister-Counselor and Deputy Chief of Mission of Russia to the United States.

References

Living people
Year of birth missing (living people)